Austria participated at the 2010 Winter Olympics in Vancouver, British Columbia, Canada.

Medalists

Alpine skiing 

Stefanie Köhle, Mario Matt and Hannes Reichelt were withdrawn from the squad prior to the opening ceremony.

Biathlon 

Tobias Eberhard and Friedrich Pinter were named in the squad but did not compete.

Bobsleigh

Cross-country skiing

Figure skating

Freestyle skiing 

Men's team – ski cross

Women's team – aerials and moguls

Women's team – ski cross

Luge

Nordic combined

Short track speed skating

Skeleton

Ski jumping 

Martin Koch was named in the squad but did not compete.

Snowboarding 

Men's snowboard cross

Men's parallel giant slalom

Women's snowboard cross 

Women's parallel giant slalom

Heidi Neururer and Anton Unterkofler were originally named in the squad but were withdrawn prior to competition.

Speed skating

See also
 Austria at the Olympics
 Austria at the 2010 Winter Paralympics

References 

Olympics
Nations at the 2010 Winter Olympics
2010